RPN USA is a Filipino satellite television International channel owned by Radio Philippines Network and Nine Media Corporation in partnership with Glocal Media. The channel offers a variety mix of programming, from CNN Philippines. including classic original programming from RPN as well as programming from CLTV 36.

RPN USA is available for Dish Network subscribers in the United States.

See also
Radio Philippines Network
CNN Philippines
CLTV 36
Nine Media Corporation
Overseas Filipino
Filipino American

References

External links
RPN USA Schedule
RPN USA Station ID on YouTube

Television networks in the United States
Radio Philippines Network
Filipino-American culture
Television channels and stations established in 2005